Wingerworth is a civil parish in the North East Derbyshire district of Derbyshire, England. The parish contains 20 listed buildings that are recorded in the National Heritage List for England.  Of these, one is listed at Grade I, the highest of the three grades, one is at Grade II*, the middle grade, and the others are at Grade II, the lowest grade.  The parish contains the village of Wingerworth and the surrounding countryside.  Most of the listed buildings are houses, cottages and associated structures, farmhouses and farm buildings.  The other listed buildings include churches, a public house, a pair of lodges and associated structures, two mileposts, and a bridge with an associated sheepwash.


Key

Buildings

References

Citations

Sources

 

Lists of listed buildings in Derbyshire